This is a list of films produced in Sri Lanka in the 2010s.

2010

2011

2012

2013

2014

2015

2016

2017

2018

2019
Twenty nine Sinhala language films were released in Sri Lanka along with one tamil film.

See also
 Cinema of Sri Lanka
 List of Sri Lankan films

References

Sources

 
 
 

2010s
Films
Sri Lanka